Thomas Sevior (26 October 1887 – 22 July 1935) was an Australian rules footballer who played with Essendon in the Victorian Football League (VFL).

Notes

External links 

Tom Sevior's playing statistics from The VFA Project

1887 births
1935 deaths
Australian rules footballers from Victoria (Australia)
Essendon Football Club players
Footscray Football Club (VFA) players
Essendon Association Football Club players